Garth Pratten (1973) is an Australian historian in the Strategic and Defence Studies Centre at the Australian National University.

Garth Pratten has worked for the Australian Army's Training Command, as an historian at the Australian War Memorial, and taught at Deakin University, in the War Studies Department at the Royal Military Academy Sandhurst and at the Australian National University. In 2010, Pratten deployed to Afghanistan as part of the team compiling the war diary for ISAF's Regional Command South while working for the British Ministry of Defence. Pratten undertook field work in France, Belgium, Libya, Malaya, Singapore, Turkey and Cyprus.

Bibliography
Garth Pratten's publications include:

Pratten, G. M., 'Calling the tune': Australian and Allied Operations at Balikpapan', in P.J. Dean (ed.), Australia 1944–45: Victory in the Pacific, Cambridge University Press, Port Melbourne, 2016. 
Pratten, G. M., 'Unique in the history of the AIF': Operations in British Borneo', in P.J. Dean (ed.), Australia 1944–45: Victory in the Pacific, Cambridge University Press, Port Melbourne, 2016. 
Pratten, G. M., 'New Model Diggers: Australian Identity, Motivation, and Cohesion in Afghanistan', in Anthony King (ed.), Frontline: Combat and Cohesion in the Twenty-First Century, Oxford University Press, Oxford, 2015. 
Pratten, G. M., "Applying the Principles of War: Securing the Huon Peninsula" in Dean, P. J. (ed.), Australia 1943: The Liberation of New Guinea, Cambridge University Press, Port Melbourne, 2013.
Pratten, G. M. & Farrell, B. P., Malaya, Army History Unit, Canberra, 2010.
Pratten, G. M., Australian Battalion Commanders in the Second World War, Cambridge University Press, Melbourne, 2009.
Pratten, G. M. & Harper, G. J. (eds.), Still the Same: Reflections on Active Service from Bardia to Baidoa, Army Doctrine Centre, Georges Heights, 1997.

References

External links
The ANU profile

1973 births
Australian military historians
Academic staff of the Australian National University
Deakin University alumni
Living people
University of Melbourne alumni